RuthenSmear is the first solo album by guitarist Pat Smear. The song "Golden Boys" was originally written by Darby Crash, but never recorded by him before his death. Vagina Dentata, a short-lived punk band that Smear was in following the death of Crash, recorded and released a version of the song on the compilation Flipside Vinyl Fanzine Vol 2, released in 1985, prior to its re-recording for this album.

Track listings

Personnel
Personnel per booklet.
 Musicians
 Pat Ruthensmear – lead and backing vocals, guitars; all instruments (tracks 2, 6 and 10); composition (all tracks except 8); lyrics (track 2); vocal arrangement (tracks 6 and 10); production
 Paul Roessler – keyboards (tracks 1, 3, 4, 7–9); lyrics (tracks 1, 4 and 10); backing vocals (tracks 3, 5 and 10); drums (track 4); piano (track 5); vocal arrangement (tracks 6 and 10); bass (track 8); pre-production
 Peyton Bulsara – bass (track 3)
 Linda Mack – drums (tracks 5, 7–9)
 Diggy Roots – harp (track 7)
 Nina Hagen – backing vocals (track 1)
 Julabell – backing vocals (tracks 6 and 10)
 Gary Jacobelly – backing vocals (track 10)
 Michelle Bell – lyrics (tracks 2 and 5)
 Darby Crash – lyrics (track 2)
 Deborah Patino – lyrics (track 3)
 Hari – lyrics (track 7)
 Kristin Farrelly – lyrics (track 7)
 Jena – lyrics (tracks 8 and 9)
 Sandra Christensen – composition (track 8)

 Additional personnel
 Ethan James – recording
 Richard Andrews – recording
 John Golden – mastering
 Alba Ballard – photography, design
 Jane Schepis – photography (Pat photo)

References

1988 debut albums
Pat Smear albums
SST Records albums